The Last Run is a 2004 American drama and comedy film directed by Jonathan Segal.

Plot 

An accountant finds out that his girlfriend is cheating him. He goes on a "run" to sleep with as many women as he can to get over his heartbreak after his best friend advises him to do so.

Cast
 Fred Savage
 Amy Adams
 Steven Pasquale
 Andrea Bogart
 Erinn Bartlett
 Vyto Ruginis
 Robert Romanus
 Ray Baker
 Abby Brammell
 Amanda Swisten
 Lisa Arturo
 Jillian Bach
 Ina Barrón
 Angela Sarafyan
 Robert Peters

Production 
The film music was composed by Laura Karpman.

References

External links
 
 

2004 films
American comedy-drama films
Films shot in California
2004 comedy-drama films
2000s English-language films
2000s American films